
The following is a list of Playboy Playmates of 1954.  Playboy magazine names its Playmate of the Month each month throughout the year. Prior to September 1959, Playmates were not asked to complete data sheets.

January

Margie Harrison was an American actress and model. She was Playmate of the Month for both January 1954 and June 1954. While Marilyn Monroe preceded her as a Playboy "Sweetheart of the Month", Monroe did not appear in the center pages, but was pictured on pages 16 to 18. Harrison is therefore the first model designated "Playmate of the Month". Like Monroe, her photo was purchased from the John Baumgarth Company, which specialized in pin-up calendars. According to The Playmate Book, Harrison also appeared in the men's magazines Follies and Gala.

February

Marilyn Ardith Jordan ( Waltz; November 5, 1931 – December 23, 2006) was an American actress and model. Using the pseudonym Margaret Scott, she was Playboy magazine's Playmate of the Month for the February 1954 issue.

Known as Marilyn Waltz, (later Marilyn Jordan), she also appeared as Playmate of the Month in the April 1954 and April 1955 issues. She was the first of two women to become a three-time Playmate (the other being Janet Pilgrim). In her first Playboy appearance, Waltz was billed as Margaret Scott. For years thereafter, many assumed that Marilyn and Margaret were two different women. It was not until the mid-1990s that they were determined to be one and the same.

Waltz was born in Waukesha, Wisconsin in 1931. In 1954, she starred in the film Love Me Madly alongside Al Molinaro. Four years later, in 1958, she married Breck Jordan. After retiring from acting and modeling, she worked in real estate in Southern California. In 1993, she moved to Oregon. She retired from real estate in 1996.

March

Dolores Del Monte (born March 15, 1932) was Playboy magazine's Playmate of the Month for the March 1954 issue.

Del Monte was born in Spokane, Washington in 1932. Growing up, she wanted to be a model. She modeled as a pin-up, keeping the secret from her parents. In 1954, when she was nineteen, she participated in a calendar shoot. The shoot included swimsuit and nude photos. She was called and told her photo would be published, assuming it was a swimsuit photo. She was paid $50 for the shoot. It ended up being for Playboy. Just after the publishing, Del Monte got married and had children. She never knew her photos ended up in Playboy until her son saw a 25th-anniversary Playboy retrospective and called Del Monte to tell her he saw her in the magazine. Del Monte said she was embarrassed and proud at the same time when her son called with the news. In an interview with The New Yorker in 2014, Del Monte said models today "show too much" and that she would never model again.

After she left modeling, Del Monte worked in public relations.

April
Marilyn Waltz (See February entry above)

May

Joanne Arnold (born April 1, 1931) was an American actress and model. She was Playboy magazine's Playmate of the Month for the May 1954 issue. She also appeared on the covers of the March 1954 and August 1955 issues.

June
Margie Harrison  (See January entry above)

July

Neva Gilbert (September 1, 1929 – November 12, 2022) was an American model.  She was Playboy magazine's Playmate of the Month for its July 1954 issue.

August

Arline Hunter (December 16, 1931 – September 11, 2018) was an American actress and model who was perhaps best known as Playboy's Playmate of the Month for August 1954. Her centerfold was the first not to be purchased from the John Baumgarth Co. by Hugh Hefner, and was photographed by Ed DeLong.

September

Jackie Rainbow (June 6, 1933 – June 15, 1988) was an American model. She was Playboy magazine's Playmate of the Month for its September 1954 issue. Her centerfold was photographed by Carlyle Blackwell for the Publix Pictorial Service.

October

Madeline Castle (born December 1, 1933) was an American model. She was Playboy magazine's Playmate of the Month for the October 1954 issue. Her centerfold was photographed by Jack Drebert and Jean Drebert. According to The Playmate Book, Castle was a prominent model in pin-ups and in men's magazines during the 1950s and early 1960s.

November

Diane Hunter (born July 14, 1937) was an American model. She was Playboy magazine's Playmate of the Month for the November 1954 issue.

December

Terry Ryan (born December 1, 1933) was an American model. She is best known as Playboy magazine's Playmate of the Month for its December 1954 issue.

Ryan's pictorial was the first photographed directly under Playboy's supervision.  Prior to this issue, Playboy had purchased layouts from independent photographers.

See also
 List of people in Playboy 1953–59

References

1954-related lists
Playmates Of 1954